Coleophora hongorella is a moth of the family Coleophoridae. It is found in Mongolia.

References

hongorella
Moths described in 1972
Moths of Asia